Karoliine Hõim (born 9 March 1989) is an Estonian badminton player.

Achievements

BWF International Challenge/Series 
Mixed doubles

  BWF International Challenge tournament
  BWF International Series tournament
  BWF Future Series tournament

References

External links 
 

1989 births
Living people
Sportspeople from Tallinn
Estonian female badminton players
Estonian expatriate sportspeople in Finland